Manoba ronkaylaszloi is a moth in the family Nolidae. It was described by Gyula M. László, Gábor Ronkay and Thomas Joseph Witt in 2010. It is found in Thailand.

References

Moths described in 2010
Nolinae